{{Automatic taxobox
| taxon = Thelecythara
| image = Thelecythara floridana 001.jpg
| image_caption = Shell of Thelecythara floridana
| authority =  Woodring, 1928 
| synonyms_ref = 
| synonyms= 
| type_species= Cythara mucronata Guppy, 1896 
| subdivision_ranks = Species
| subdivision = See text
| display_parents = 3
}}Thelecythara is a genus of sea snails, marine gastropod mollusks in the family Pseudomelatomidae.

Species
Species within the genus Thelecythara include:
 Thelecythara dushanae McLean & Poorman, 1971
 Thelecythara floridana Fargo, 1953
 Thelecythara mucronata (Guppy, 1896)
 † Thelecythara oligocaenica Lozouet, 2017
Species brought into synonymy 
 Thelecythara borroi Sarasúa, 1975 : synonym of Thelecythara floridana Fargo, 1953
 Thelecythara cruzensis Nowell-Usticke, G.W., 1969: synonym of Thelecythara floridana Fargo, 1953
 Thelecythara dominguezi Gibson-Smith J. & W., 1983: synonym of Maesiella dominguezi'' (J. Gibson-Smith & W. Gibson-Smith, 1983)
 Thelecythara vitrea (Reeve, 1845): synonym of Otitoma vitrea (Reeve, 1845)

References

 W. P. Woodring. 1928. Miocene Molluscs from Bowden, Jamaica. Part 2: Gastropods and discussion of results. Contributions to the Geology and Palaeontology of the West Indies
 Lozouet P. (2017). Les Conoidea de l'Oligocène supérieur (Chattien) du bassin de l'Adour (Sud-Ouest de la France). Cossmanniana. 19: 3-180.

External links
  Tucker, J.K. 2004 Catalog of recent and fossil turrids (Mollusca: Gastropoda). Zootaxa 682:1-1295.
  Bouchet, P.; Kantor, Y. I.; Sysoev, A.; Puillandre, N. (2011). A new operational classification of the Conoidea. Journal of Molluscan Studies. 77, 273-308
 Worldwide Mollusc Species Data Base: Thelecythara

 
Pseudomelatomidae